Pisistrata is a genus of moths belonging to the family Tineidae.

It contains only one species: Pisistrata trypheropa Meyrick, 1924 from the Cook islands.

References

Tineidae
Tineidae genera
Monotypic moth genera